In music, Op. 411 stands for Opus number 411. Compositions that are assigned this number include:

 Hovhaness – Symphony No. 63
 Strauss – Lagunen-Walzer